Half of Where You Live is the second studio album by English electronic music producer Gold Panda. It was released on 11 June 2013 under Ghostly International.

Track listing

Charts

References

External links
 

2013 albums
Ghostly International albums
Gold Panda albums